Killing Them Softly (stylized in marketing as killing them softly) is a 2012 American neo-noir crime film written and directed by Andrew Dominik and starring Brad Pitt. Based on George V. Higgins' 1974 novel Cogan's Trade, the story follows Jackie Cogan, a hitman who is hired to deal with the aftermath of a Mafia poker game robbery that ruptured the criminal economy; the events are set during the 2008 United States presidential election and financial crisis. Scoot McNairy, Ben Mendelsohn, Richard Jenkins, James Gandolfini, Ray Liotta, and Sam Shepard also star.

On May 22, 2012, the film premiered in competition for the Palme d'Or at the 2012 Cannes Film Festival and received positive early reviews. Killing Them Softly was released on November 30, 2012, domestically by The Weinstein Company and internationally by Inferno Distribution to mostly positive reviews, even though general audiences were less receptive to the film. It grossed $37.9 million against a budget of $15 million.

Plot
During the American financial crisis and presidential election campaign of 2008, Johnny "Squirrel" Amato plans to rob a Mafia poker game. He enlists Frankie, a former business associate, and Russell, a heroin-addicted Australian expatriate who is stealing purebred dogs for money. They decide to target a game run by Markie Trattman, who is known to have previously orchestrated an inside job by paying two men to rob his own illegal poker game. Squirrel anticipates that Markie will be the obvious suspect because of this, and the Mafia will simply have him killed without investigating further.

Frankie and Russell, although obviously amateurs, do the holdup and leave with the money. Afterwards, a mafioso named Driver hires hitman Jackie Cogan to deal with the situation. Although Jackie correctly intuits that Markie was uninvolved with the recent heist, he believes Markie still needs to die since he looks guilty, and an example needs to be made to discourage further robberies, but not without arranging for Markie to suffer a beating by mobsters Steve and Barry.

Upon completing the crime, Russell travels to Florida to sell the dogs. While in Florida, he inadvertently informs a man named Kenny Gill of his involvement in the heist while trying to recruit him as a drug dealer. Kenny informs Jackie, who deduces that Russell, Frankie, and Squirrel were the perpetrators.

Jackie carries out the hit on Markie himself but brings in another hitman named Mickey Fallon, who is on parole in New York, to kill Squirrel. Jackie explains to Driver how he prefers "killing them softly"—shooting his victims from a distance, without warning, giving them no opportunity to experience fear or despair—and that his acquaintance with Squirrel risks complicating this approach.

Mickey postpones going through with his assigned hit, and instead indulges in drunkenness and sex with prostitutes in a hotel room. During conversation with Jackie, Mickey reveals that he has violated his parole, and doesn't seem to either care about nor really comprehend the consequences; instead he goes off on drunken tangents. It becomes clear to Jackie that the respected hitman has lost his nerve and ability to do his job. Jackie eventually decides to carry out the hit on Squirrel himself. He convinces Driver to arrange Mickey's arrest before the job has been completed.

Russell is arrested on a drug possession charge and deported; meanwhile, Jackie confronts Frankie and convinces him to trade Squirrel's whereabouts for his life. Jackie has Frankie drive him to Squirrel; upon reaching Squirrel's apartment complex, he kills Squirrel with a shotgun. After confirming Squirrel is dead, Jackie has Frankie drive him to get his car several hours away. Frankie becomes very nervous and begins speeding. Unable to get Frankie to slow down, Jackie takes over driving. Once they arrive at the parking garage, Jackie shoots Frankie in the head without warning. Jackie then wipes down any fingerprints he might have left and leaves the scene.

On the night of the presidential election, Jackie meets with Driver to collect his fee for the three hits. On the TV in the bar, Barack Obama is giving his election victory speech. The two argue over his fee, with Driver trying to pay a lesser amount and Jackie insisting on the full sum. Referring to Obama's speech, Jackie angrily declares: "This guy wants to tell me we're living in a community? Don't make me laugh. I'm living in America, and in America, you're on your own. America is not a country; it's just a business. Now fucking pay me."

Cast

Production
Killing Them Softly is based on the 1974 novel Cogan's Trade by George V. Higgins. Cogan's Trade, like Higgins' other novels, takes place in Boston; although filmed in the New Orleans area, characters in Killing Them Softly make several references to Boston area suburbs from the original novel. The film was written and directed by Andrew Dominik, who chose to update the setting of the story, saying "as I started adapting it, it was the story of an economic crisis, and it was an economic crisis in an economy that was funded by gambling—and the crisis occurred due to a failure in regulation. It just seemed to have something that you couldn't ignore."

The project was first announced in November 2010, when Brad Pitt was reported to be in talks to star in it. Dominik asked Pitt if he was interested in a role via a text message; he replied "yes" and the matter was settled over half an hour. Pitt previously co-starred in Dominik's The Assassination of Jesse James by the Coward Robert Ford (2007). Production was scheduled to begin in Louisiana in March 2011, with pre-production beginning in January. Additional roles were cast in early 2011.

According to Garret Dillahunt, the film's first cut was two-and-a-half hours long. Dillahunt, who had a cameo in the film, did not make the final cut for the theatrical release.

The music in the film is primarily taken from pop, rock and R&B songs from many artists and decades, with the exception of one original song, "The Feeling in My Nuts", by Marc Streitenfeld, which James Christopher Monger of AllMusic said matched the film's "idiosyncratic nature". Rachel Fox supervised the song implementation. A soundtrack album was sold containing most of the songs heard in the film, and substituting some instrumental versions which were not heard. The song "Windmills of Your Mind", sung by Petula Clark, was in the film but not included on the soundtrack album.

Release
Killing Them Softly premiered at the 65th Cannes Film Festival on May 22, 2012, where it was selected to be "In Competition" for the Palme D'Or; it lost to Amour. The film was scheduled to released in the United States on September 21, 2012; however it was delayed until November 30, 2012, to avoid competing with The Master and to improve its chances for award nominations. The film kept its original release date in other parts of the world, with the somewhat unusual result that it opened in the UK and India more than two months before the US opening.

The Weinstein Company distributed the film theatrically in the U.S. and Canada, while Inferno Distribution released internationally.

Home media
Killing Them Softly was released by The Weinstein Company Home Entertainment and Anchor Bay Entertainment on Blu-ray & DVD March 26, 2013. The film was released in Australia earlier, on February 13, and on February 25 in the UK.

Reception

Box office
In its opening weekend, Killing Them Softly grossed $6.8 million. The film made $15 million domestically and $22.9 million internationally for a worldwide total of $37.9 million.

Critical response
On Rotten Tomatoes the film has an approval rating of 74% based on 234 reviews, with an average rating of 6.90/10. The site's critical consensus reads: "Killing Them Softly is a darkly comic, visceral thriller that doubles as a cautionary tale on capitalism, whose message is delivered with sledgehammer force." On Metacritic, the film received a weighted average score of 64 out of 100, based on 42 critics indicating "generally favorable reviews".

Peter Bradshaw of The Guardian gave Killing them Softly 5 stars, saying the film is a "compelling comment on economic bloodletting in the real world". Tim Robey of The Daily Telegraph gave the film 4 stars describing it as "bleakly electrifying". Total Film awarded it 3 stars calling it "tough, stylish, violent and studded with stars" but countered that it "doesn’t quite get the job done". Roger Ebert was even less receptive, calling it "a dismal, dreary series of cruel and painful murders" cast in a similarly "dreary and joyless cityscape". He also found the performances dependent mostly on the actors' established screen presences while pointing out improbabilities in the plot, such as how the mafia manages to support itself without crimes involving civilians: "Like a captive animal struggling to free itself from a trap, they seem reduced to gnawing off their own legs."

References

External links

  (archived)
 
 
 
 
 

2012 films
2012 black comedy films
2012 crime drama films
2012 crime thriller films
American black comedy films
American crime drama films
American gangster films
American neo-noir films
Films about the American Mafia
Films set in the Great Recession
Films about contract killing
Films about violence
Films based on American novels
Films based on crime novels
Films directed by Andrew Dominik
Films set in 2008
Films shot in New Orleans
Plan B Entertainment films
Annapurna Pictures films
Films produced by Brad Pitt
2010s English-language films
2010s American films